is a Japanese manga series written and illustrated by Akissa Saiké. It has been serialized in Shueisha's Shōnen Jump+ service since July 2020, with its chapters collected into four tankōbon volumes as of March 2022.

Publication 
Ghost Reaper Girl is written and illustrated by Akissa Saiké. The manga began its serialization in Shueisha's online magazine Shōnen Jump+ service on July 13, 2020. Shueisha has collected its chapters into individual tankōbon volumes. The first volume was released on December 4, 2020.

The manga is the author's  third series. And it is his first new manga series since he changed his manga artist name from Akihisa Ikeda to Akissa Saiké. It has been serialized biweekly, about 6 years after, following the ending of his previous manga series Rosario + Vampire on April 19, 2014.   For the names of the characters, etc. are based on names from the Cthulhu Mythos.

The series has been licensed for simultaneous publication in North America as it is released in Japan, with its chapters being digitally launched by Viz Media on its Shonen Jump website. Viz Media is publishing the manga in left-to-right format at Saiké's request. Shueisha also simulpublishes the series in English for free on the Manga Plus app and website. Viz Media has begun releasing physical volumes with the first volume on June 7, 2022.

Volume list

Chapters not yet in tankōbon format 
These chapters have yet to be published in a tankōbon volume.

Reception 
Reviewing Ghost Reaper Girl, Steven Blackburn of Screen Rant compared the manga to other Japanese series that he says involve "some type of creature entering the hero's body and granting the host powers", such as Parasyte, Kaiju No. 8, Dragon Ball GT and Jujutsu Kaisen; Blackburn claimed that Ghost Reaper Girl is a refreshing take of this trope, commenting that "there isn't really anything like Ghost Reaper Girl".

Notes

Explanatory notes

References

External links 
  
 
 

2020 manga
Action anime and manga
Cthulhu Mythos stories
Japanese webcomics
Shōnen manga
Shueisha manga
Supernatural anime and manga
Viz Media manga
Webcomics in print